National Technology Transfer Network (NTTN),, within technology transfer, is built according to the methodology and models of European Innovation Relay Centers – IRC network (EEN – since 2008), Russian Technology Transfer Network RTTN and Ukrainian Technology Transfer Network UTTN.
 
The project of creating the network is intended to unify informational resources of state, public and private innovation structures of Ukraine, companies, institutions and organizations into one technology transfer network and its further integration into the European Network EEN.

The main objectives 
 Transfer of technologies, know-how between science sectors and industry.
 Search for partners and investors for cooperation to develop and implement scientific advanced technology product in Ukraine and abroad.
 Organization of NTTN cooperation with Russian, Belorussian and other international technology transfer networks.

References

External links
Website
uk

Science and technology in Ukraine
Scientific organizations based in Ukraine